Tup Qarah Rural District is in Do Tappeh District of Khodabandeh County, Zanjan province, Iran. It was formed in 2019 when Howmeh Rural District was elevated to the status of Do Tappeh District and divided into two rural districts. The capital of the rural district is Tup Qarah, whose population in 2016 was 890 in 277 households.

References 

Khodabandeh County

Rural Districts of Zanjan Province

Populated places in Zanjan Province

Populated places in Khodabandeh County

fa:دهستان توپقره